WCSV (1490 AM, "97.7 The Ticket") is a radio station broadcasting a sports format. Licensed to Crossville, Tennessee, United States, the station is currently owned by Peg Broadcasting, LLC, and features programming from ESPN Radio.

References

External links

CSV
ESPN Radio stations
Radio stations established in 1968
1968 establishments in Tennessee